Michael Joseph Rochford (born March 14, 1963) is a former relief pitcher in Major League Baseball who played from  through  for the Boston Red Sox. He also pitched for the Yakult Swallows at the end of the 1990 season.

A , 205 lbs. left-handed specialist, Rochford was selected by the Red Sox in the first round of the 1982 January draft out of Santa Fe (Florida) Community College. Prior to college, he was an outstanding three-sport athlete at South Burlington High School graduating in 1981. In high school, he led the Rebels to Vermont state championships in baseball and football (quarterback) and was one of the best basketball players in the state scoring over 1,000 career points as a four-year starter. He is the first and only product of a Vermont high school to be selected in the Major League Baseball Amateur Draft and go on to reach the major leagues.

He spent six years in the Boston minor league system before joining the big club late in 1988.

In a three-season big league career, Rochford posted a 0–1 record with a 9.58  ERA in eight appearances, giving up 17 runs (11 unearned) on 18 hits and nine walks while striking out two without a save in  innings of work. In part of nine minor league seasons, he went 75–64 with a 3.53 ERA in 250 games, including 161 starts. Pitching for Winston-Salem in 1983, he was named to the Carolina League All-Star Team and he led Pawtucket of the AAA International League in victories (11) in 1986. He made his major league debut on September 3, 1988, against the California Angels at Anaheim Stadium.

He currently is a golf pro in southern Florida.

External links
Baseball Reference

Retrosheet

1963 births
Living people
People from Methuen, Massachusetts
Major League Baseball pitchers
Boston Red Sox players
Yakult Swallows players
American expatriate baseball players in Japan
Pawtucket Red Sox players
Winston-Salem Spirits players
Elmira Pioneers players
New Britain Red Sox players
Baseball players from Massachusetts
Baseball players from Vermont
People from South Burlington, Vermont
Sportspeople from Essex County, Massachusetts
Junior college baseball players in the United States